The 1992 NBA playoffs was the postseason tournament following the National Basketball Association's 1991-92 season. The tournament concluded with the Eastern Conference champion Chicago Bulls defeating the Western Conference champion Portland Trail Blazers 4 games to 2 in the NBA Finals. Michael Jordan was named NBA Finals MVP for the second straight year.

The Blazers won their second Western Conference title in the past three years, third overall in franchise history, behind the leadership of Clyde Drexler.

The Jazz made the Western Conference Finals for the first time in franchise history. They returned in 1994 and 1996 before finally breaking through in 1997.

The fourth-year Miami Heat became the first of the 1988 and 1989 expansion teams to make the playoffs, though they were swept in the first round by the Bulls. In 2006, the Heat would become the first of these teams to win the NBA title.

This was the first year since 1987 that the Bulls and Pistons did not meet in the playoffs. They did not meet again until 2007.

This was the first time since 1986, that the Pistons did not reach the Eastern Conference Finals, as well as, losing in the first round.

The Clippers made it to the playoffs for the first time since 1976, when they were the Buffalo Braves. It was also the first time since the Clippers arrival in Los Angeles in 1984 that both of Los Angeles' NBA teams, the Clippers and Lakers, qualified for postseason play together.

Despite Magic Johnson's stunning retirement due to testing HIV positive prior to the start of the season, the Los Angeles Lakers still managed to make their 16th straight NBA playoff appearance. It was their first appearance since 1974 without Johnson, Michael Cooper, or Kareem Abdul-Jabbar.

Two games were postponed due to the Los Angeles riots following the Rodney King verdict, one being the Trail Blazers at the Lakers and the other was the Jazz at the Clippers. For safety purposes, both the Lakers and Clippers decided to move their home games to a nearby alternate venue; the Lakers played at the Thomas & Mack Center in Las Vegas, Nevada (formerly an alternate home arena of the Jazz in 1983–84 and 1984–85 seasons; later host to the 2007 NBA All-Star Game) for Game 4, the Clippers at Anaheim Convention Center in Anaheim, California for Game 4 (the Clippers returned to Anaheim at Arrowhead Pond in 1994 as an alternate venue and played there until 1999 whenever the Los Angeles Memorial Sports Arena was unavailable).

Game 4 of the Blazers-Suns series was the last game ever played at the Arizona Veterans Memorial Coliseum. It was a long game which lasted two overtimes and broke the NBA's playoff game record for points scored in one game, the Trail Blazers outlasting the Suns by a score of 153-151.

The Celtics' first round sweep of the Pacers would be their last playoff series win until 2002. After losing in the second round to Cleveland, Larry Bird retired after 13 seasons. As for the Cavs, it was their first Conference Finals appearance since 1976, but fell to the Bulls in 6 games. They would not return again until 2007.

Playoff seeds

Eastern Conference
 Chicago Bulls (67-15)
 Boston Celtics (51-31)
 Cleveland Cavaliers (57-25)
 New York Knicks (51-31)
 Detroit Pistons (48-34)
 New Jersey Nets (40-42)
 Indiana Pacers (40-42)
 Miami Heat (38-44)

Western Conference
 Portland Trail Blazers (57-25)
 Utah Jazz (55-27)
 Golden State Warriors (55-27)
 Phoenix Suns (53-29)
 San Antonio Spurs (47-35)
 Seattle SuperSonics (47-35)
 Los Angeles Clippers (45-37)
 Los Angeles Lakers (43-39)

Bracket

First round

Eastern Conference first round

(1) Chicago Bulls vs. (8) Miami Heat

 The first playoff game in Miami Heat history.

This was the first playoff meeting between the Bulls and the Heat.

(2) Boston Celtics vs. (7) Indiana Pacers

This was the second playoff meeting between these two teams, with the Celtics winning the first meeting.

(3) Cleveland Cavaliers vs. (6) New Jersey Nets

This was the first playoff meeting between the Cavaliers and the Nets.

(4) New York Knicks vs. (5) Detroit Pistons

 Isiah Thomas hits game-winning jumper with 7.6 seconds left.

 Patrick Ewing hits the game-tying shot with 13.4 seconds left.

This was the third playoff meeting between these two teams, with each team winning one series apiece.

Western Conference first round

(1) Portland Trail Blazers vs. (8) Los Angeles Lakers

 Terry Porter hits the game-tying 3 with 29.6 seconds left to force OT.

(*) Due to 1992 Los Angeles riots

This was the sixth playoff meeting between these two teams, with the Lakers winning four of the first five meetings.

(2) Utah Jazz vs. (7) Los Angeles Clippers

(*) Due to 1992 Los Angeles riots

This was the first playoff meeting between the Clippers and the Jazz.

(3) Golden State Warriors vs. (6) Seattle SuperSonics

 Gary Payton's famous alley-oop to Shawn Kemp.

 Shawn Kemp's famous dunk on Alton Lister.

This was the second playoff meeting between these two teams, with the Warriors winning the first meeting.

(4) Phoenix Suns vs. (5) San Antonio Spurs

This was the first playoff meeting between the Suns and the Spurs.

Conference semifinals

Eastern Conference semifinals

(1) Chicago Bulls vs. (4) New York Knicks

 The Knicks' only playoff victory in Chicago to date.

 This game featured Michael Jordan's famous steal and strip. 

This was the fourth playoff meeting between these two teams, with the Bulls winning the first three meetings.

(2) Boston Celtics vs. (3) Cleveland Cavaliers

 Larry Nance hits the game-tying free throws with 29.3 seconds left to force OT.

 Larry Bird's final NBA game.

This was the third playoff meeting between these two teams, with the Celtics winning the first two meetings.

Western Conference semifinals

(1) Portland Trail Blazers vs. (4) Phoenix Suns

 Terry Porter hits the game-tying 3-point play with 33.6 seconds left in regulation to force the first OT; Kevin Johnson hits the game-tying jumper with 2.7 seconds left in the first OT to force the second OT.

This was the fourth playoff meeting between these two teams, with the Suns winning two of the first three meetings.

(2) Utah Jazz vs. (6) Seattle SuperSonics

This was the first playoff meeting between the SuperSonics and the Jazz.

Conference finals

Eastern Conference finals

(1) Chicago Bulls vs. (3) Cleveland Cavaliers

This was the third playoff meeting between these two teams, with the Bulls winning the first two meetings.

Western Conference finals

(1) Portland Trail Blazers vs. (2) Utah Jazz

 Delaney Rudd hits the game-tying 3 with 5.5 seconds left to force OT.

This was the third playoff meeting between these two teams, with each team winning one series apiece.

NBA Finals: (E1) Chicago Bulls vs. (W1) Portland Trail Blazers

 Michael Jordan scores 35 points in the first half, along with a then-record six 3-pointers.

 Kevin Duckworth hits the game-tying shot with 17.3 seconds left.

 Chicago overcomes a 79–64 deficit at the start of the 4th quarter to win their second straight title.

This was the second playoff meeting between these two teams, with the Trail Blazers winning the first meeting.

References

External links
Basketball-Reference's 1992 Playoffs page

National Basketball Association playoffs
Playoffs
Sports in Portland, Oregon
GMA Network television specials

fi:NBA-kausi 1991–1992#Pudotuspelit